The ASTRA Award for Channel of the Year is an award presented at the ASTRA Awards. It has been presented at every ASTRA Awards except the first (in 2003).

Overview

Recipients

 Each year is linked to the article about the ASTRA Awards held that year.

References

Awards established in 2004